The Supreme Court of Canada, the highest court of Canada, and the final court of appeals in the Canadian justice system, is composed of nine justices—a chief justice and eight puisne judges—appointed by the Governor General-in-Council. Altogether, 88 persons have served on the Court since it was created in 1875; during this time there have been 18 chief justices.

The graphical timeline below lists the justices of the Supreme Court of Canada by court composition. As Supreme Court historians categorize eras in the court's history by the name of the presiding chief justice, the timeline is divided into sections, according to who was chief justice at the time. The incumbent puisne justices at the start of each court era are listed in order of their seniority at that time. Justices joining the Court during an era are listed below them in the order of their appointment. The bars are colour-coded to show the changes in seniority among the justices during each era.

List of justices

Richards Court

The Richards Court era, under the leadership of William Buell Richards, lasted from September 30, 1875 to January 10, 1879.

Ritchie Court

The  Ritchie Court era, under the leadership of William Johnstone Ritchie, lasted from January 11, 1879 to September 25, 1892.

Strong Court

The Strong  Court era, under the leadership of Samuel Henry Strong, lasted from December 13, 1892 – November 18, 1902.

H.-E. Taschereau Court

The H.-E. Taschereau Court era, under the leadership of Henri-Elzéar Taschereau, lasted from November 21, 1902 to May 2, 1906.

Fitzpatrick Court

The Fitzpatrick Court era, under the leadership of Charles Fitzpatrick, lasted from June 4, 1906 to October 21, 1918. He is the only chief justice to date, other than the Court's inaugural chief justice, Sir William Buell Richards, to have served in that position without having first been a puisne Justice on the court.

Davies Court

The Davies Court era, under the leadership of Louis Henry Davies, lasted from October 23, 1918 to May 1, 1924.

Anglin Court

The Anglin Court era, under the leadership of Francis Alexander Anglin, lasted from September 16, 1924 to February 28, 1933. A sixth puisne justice position was created in 1927, bringing the Court to a total of seven justices.

Duff Court

The Duff Court era, under the leadership of Lyman Duff, lasted from March 17, 1933 to January 6, 1944.

Rinfret Court

The Rinfret Court era, under the leadership of Thibaudeau Rinfret, lasted from January 8, 1944 to June 22, 1954. Two additional puisne justice seats were created in 1949, bringing the Court to its current composition of nine justices.

Kerwin Court

The Kerwin Court era, under the leadership of Patrick Kerwin, lasted from July 1, 1954 to February 2, 1963.

R. Taschereau Court

The R. Taschereau Court era, under the leadership of Robert Taschereau, lasted from April 22, 1963 to September 1, 1967.

Cartwright Court

The Cartwright Court era, under the leadership of John Robert Cartwright, lasted from September 1, 1967 to March 23, 1970.

Fauteux Court

The Fauteux Court era, under the leadership of Gérald Fauteux, lasted from March 23, 1970 to December 23, 1973.

Laskin Court

The Laskin Court era, under the leadership of Bora Laskin, lasted from December 27, 1973 to March 26, 1984.

Dickson Court

The Dickson Court era, under the leadership of Brian Dickson, lasted from April 18, 1984 to June 30, 1990.

Lamer Court

The Lamer Court era, under the leadership of Antonio Lamer, lasted from July 1, 1990 to January 6, 2000.

McLachlin Court

The McLachlin Court era, under the leadership of Beverley McLachlin, lasted from January 7, 2000 to December 15, 2017. She is both the first woman to hold that position and the longest serving chief justice in Canadian history.

Wagner Court
The Wagner Court era, under the leadership of Richard Wagner, began December 18, 2017 and is ongoing.

Sources

External links
 Supreme Court of Canada/Cour suprême du Canada
 Supreme Court of Canada: Role, History, and Operation, Maple Leaf Web

τ
Canada, Supreme Court of